Kolodko or Kołodko is a gender-neutral Slavic surname. Notable people with the surname include:

Grzegorz Kołodko (born 1949), Polish economist
Yevgeniya Kolodko (born 1990), Russian shot putter

Slavic-language surnames